Phrateres is a philanthropic-social organization for female college students.

History 

Phrateres was founded at UCLA in 1924 by the dean of women, Helen Matthewson Laughlin.  The intention was to bring "independent" women students (i.e. those not in dormitories or sororities) into a collective group for the purposes of socialization and philanthropy.  However, the new group proved popular and soon membership was extended to any female student who wished to join.  Members now included those who lived in dorms, commuted to campus, as well as members of sororities.  Word spread to other colleges, especially those on the West Coast.  The Beta Chapter was installed at the University of Washington in 1929.  The 1930s saw the installation of ten more chapters: Gamma & Delta in 1930, Epsilon in 1931, Zeta in 1932, Eta in 1933, Theta & Iota in 1935, Kappa in 1936, Lambda in 1937, and Nu in 1939.  Phrateres now had chapters in seven states and one province in Canada (Theta at the University of British Columbia would remain the only Canadian chapter from 1935 to 1961).   The 1940s brought four more chapters: Xi & Omicron in 1941, Rho in 1942, and Sigma in 1945, for a total of sixteen active collegiate chapters (the most ever at one time).  However, from 1945 until the late 1950s, three of those chapters closed: Delta, Eta, and Omicron.  Their chapter names were later reused for newly installed chapters at different schools in 1950 (Delta), 1958 (Eta), and 1964 (Omicron).  Along with those, the final four chapters were installed in the 1960s, including three more in Canada: Omega in 1961, Tau in 1966, Phi in the mid to late 1960s, and Psi in 1967.

From the 1930s to the 1990s, conventions were held every one to two years, with members of the host chapter housing delegates from other chapters.  Chapters could win awards, such as "Most Active Chapter" and "Best Scrapbook."

The earliest known date of a chapter closing was the first Omicron in 1945  Only one other chapter closing is known with certainty: Lambda in 2000.  Beta closed sometime in the 1970s and the second Eta chapter is known to have closed in the 1990s (the first Eta Chapter was closed by 1958, but evidence of activity has only been found up to 1949).  Conflicting evidence either has Zeta closing in 1943 or the 1980s.  Gamma also has two possible years: 1961 or 1968.  Based on found documentation, the following chapters were active as late as the year given: Xi in 1945, Iota in 1949, Epsilon in 1951, Kappa in 1956, Sigma in 1968, Omega also in 1968, Psi in 1969, Tau in 1970, Alpha in 1974, and Rho in 1985. Unfortunately, for five chapters, the closing year is unknown due to an almost total lack of documentation.  The first Delta chapter was closed by 1950, when the second one was installed.  As for the second Delta, Nu, the second Omicron, and Phi, the only chapter records are those of installations (but it is known that none of them were active as of 1990).

In the 1990s, only three active collegiate chapters remained: Theta, Lambda, and the second Eta (the former in Canada; the latter two in Arizona, both of which were co-ed by this time).  Eta closed during that decade and Lambda closed in 2000.  Now, the only active collegiate chapter was Theta at the University of British Columbia (UBC). The Phrateres International Board saw little purpose to its own existence (being that only one active chapter remained) and disbanded in 2001.  As of 2015, the Theta Chapter still exists at UBC in the form of a self-governing AMS (Alma Mater Society, UBC's student society) club.

2009–10: anniversary year 

The 2009–10 school year marked two important milestones for the Phrateres organization: the 85th anniversary of the founding of Phrateres at UCLA and the 75th anniversary of the founding of the Theta Chapter at UBC.  The Theta Chapter organized a celebration that was held in 2010, which featured a wide range of Phrateres sisters whose ages ranged from over 70 years, to 19. This event marked how important this organization was, and continues to be in the development of the individual, as well as fostering lifelong friendships, sisterhood, and memories.

History project 

The Theta Chapter is currently compiling a more thorough history of Phrateres.  The chapter is seeking out alumnae members of any chapter who can provide information, including, but not limited to, oral history or memories, yearbooks, manuals, photos, chapter newsletters, student newspaper articles, anything from or about Phrateres International, etc.  The basic goal is to compile a complete listing of all the chapters that ever existed, including founding and closing dates, and histories of each individual chapter.

As is apparent above, current historical knowledge is limited.  Sources thus far have been Theta Chapter yearbooks and newsletters in the UBC archives, information available on the internet through online search engines, and Theta Chapter alumnae.

Phrateres International 

The International consisted of the board of trustees: Phrateres alumnae living in the Greater Los Angeles area.  It collected fees from each chapter, as well as published a regular newsletter, The  Phraterean, with notices from each chapter.  The Lura Heeter Award was a scholarship given to one collegiate member each year (began as a memorial award within the Zeta Chapter in 1985).

When the board disbanded in 2001, it gave its remaining funds to the Theta Chapter.  Monies from the Lura Heeter Award were given to the Zeta Alumnae Chapter.

The board was led by a Grand President:

 Helen Matthewson Laughlin, 1924–1957
 Marjorie Chilstrom, 1957–1972, officially retired in 1972 but remained grand president until Phrateres International disbanded when the Lambda (University of Arizona) chapter closed
 Cynthia Johnson, co-chairman of board of trustees with Lynne Love, 1973–1976
 Lynne Love, chairman of board of trustees, 1976-? Remained as a board of trustees member until the 1990s
 Laurie Smith, executive director, -1988
 Betsy Weisman, executive director, 1988–2001

Collegiate chapters 

At present, records for 26 collegiate chapters have been found.  Twenty-three were in the United States, with Colorado, New Mexico, Oregon, Texas, Wisconsin, Utah, and Ohio each having one chapter; Arizona having three, Illinois, and Washington each having two; and the remaining nine all in California (three of which were in Los Angeles alone).  The remaining four were in Canada, with one in Ontario and three in British Columbia, including Theta, the sole remaining active chapter.

Nomenclature 
Chapters were named in the order of the Greek alphabet.  No records have been found for Mu, Pi, Upsilon, or Chi chapters, although the fact that three other letters were used twice supports their possible existence.

The two Arizona chapters (Lambda at University of Arizona and Eta at Arizona State University) referred to themselves, respectively, as "Phi Lambda Phrateres" and "Phi Eta Phrateres."  The Theta chapter at UBC has records of being called "Phi Theta" but this practice has been discontinued.

Alumnae chapters 

The collegiate Theta Chapter hosts an annual "Alumnae Tea" each February (celebrating date of installation at UBC).  Theta alumnae, some of whom are from the established Theta Alumnae Chapter, are always present.  The collegiate Theta Chapter is interested in hearing from any other Alumnae or Alumnae Chapters in existence.

Despite the short life of the collegiate Zeta Chapter at Carroll College, a strong Alumnae Chapter grew and is still in existence.

Theta Chapter

70+ years 

In 2006, Theta celebrated 70 years of Phrateres at UBC with a gala celebration.  Contacting alumnae proved difficult, unfortunately.  Many members had married and taken new names.  As well, records often only included the street address of the woman while she had been a student, providing no current mailing address or email address.  Collegiate and alumnae members of the Theta Chapter were joined by spouses, parents, and a Rho Chapter alumnae, who had never been to Canada before.

History 
The only remaining active chapter was often the largest during the heyday of Phrateres.  In the mid-1930s, Clare Brown (President of the Women's Undergraduate Society) petitioned Mary Bollert (1880s?-1945) (Dean of Women) to bring Phrateres to UBC.  The Theta Chapter was installed on February 1, 1935.  It was the eighth chapter installed, but the first Canadian chapter.

From installation until the 1970s, membership was large enough to support as many as 12 Sub-Chapters.  Each Sub-Chapter had its own president and council, with all Sub-Chapters falling under the control of an executive council comprising the Rho Sub-Chapter.  Each Sub-Chapter also had a faculty advisor and recruited members separately.  This promoted friendly competition between the Sub-Chapters.

In those earlier decades, students at UBC had to wait until their sophomore year to join fraternities and sororities.  Freshman female students were required to join Phrateres if they wanted to join a sorority later.  After that first year, members either decided to stay solely in Phrateres, leave Phrateres for a sorority, or maintain membership in both.  When the policy changed, and freshmen were allowed to rush, the Theta Chapter experienced a dramatic decline in membership (since the 1980s, membership has not exceeded 100).  From that point onwards, Phrateres at UBC was no longer seen as an organization to unify all women students, as had been the vision of Dean Laughlin at UCLA in 1924.  Sub-chapters eventually ceased and the club presently operates as one unified chapter.

4 S's 
Phrateres' activities are based on the 4S's: Sisterhood, Sports, Social, and Service. At Theta Chapter, sisterhood is encouraged by matching pledges with active members in the "Big/Little Sister Program", through nights out and nights in, and through study table sessions. Members often participate in UBC sports events and support the UBC Thunderbirds. Social activities include fraternity exchanges and the annual formals and semi-formals.

Philanthropy 
The Theta Chapter organizes and participates in various philanthropic events throughout the year.  Having no official charity, the club helps a variety of organizations.

Annual events include:

 Terry Fox Run: each September the chapter organizes a Terry Fox Run on the westside of Vancouver.  The current route takes participants through the Pacific Spirit Park. The 2005 Run commemorated the 25th anniversary of the Marathon of Hope.  That year, the local run organized by Phrateres raised $26,000.
 Show of Hearts Telethon: each February the Theta Chapter volunteers time to answer phones during the Show of Hearts Telethon.  The telethon is a fundraiser for Variety - The Children's Charity.  Members usually take shifts from midnight to 4 am and/or 4 am to 8 am.
 24 Hour Relay: each June the Theta Chapter participates in the 24 Hour Relay.  This event is organized by the B.C. Lions Society for Children with Disabilities, a group under the umbrella of Easter Seals.  Teams camp at Burnaby's Central Park and send runners and walkers on a 4 km route through the park, starting and ending in Swangard Stadium.  In the 2008 relay, held June 14-15th, the Theta Chapter fundraised $2,688.83 and the entire relay raised $1,315,304.  All funds raised help send disabled children to specially equipped summer camps in British Columbia.
 Phrateres Party: during the second term of the school year, the chapter hosts a party, benefiting a different organization each year. It is a costume party, and the theme since 2004 has been a Flintstones/general caveman medley, under the name "Bedrock".  Until 2008, the party was held at a fraternity house on campus (most recently, Psi Upsilon and Delta Kappa Epsilon), with that fraternity and the Theta Chapter splitting the proceeds.  In 2008, the Theta chapter opted to host the party themselves at the Pit Pub in the Student Union Building.  The 2008 party proceeds went to Right to Play.  Previous to the "Bedrock" theme, the party was held annually under the "Boxer Bash" name.
 Express Yourself Fashion Shows: In 2013, the Theta chapter began partnering with the Battered Women's Support Services and their social enterprise, My Sister's Closet, and the AMS Sexual Assault Support Centre (SASC) to organize and host two fashion shows to promote and raise money for the educational, advocacy, and legal services of the two organizations.

Pledgeship 
All women are encouraged and welcomed to join the organization. Pledgeship involves a year where members get to participate in the organization's events and get to know what the girls and organization are about. Pledges often form strong bonds with their pledge classes and enjoy this period of flexible fun. Pledges will also have the opportunity to take on leadership roles by running to become their Pledge President, and organizing a pledge project together.

Notable alumni
Irma Schoennauer Cole (1920-2003) (Beta), one of the United States' premier swimmers in the late 1930s and early 1940s.

Joy Coghill (1926–Present) (Theta), Actress, director, artistic director, theatre producer, teacher, playwright, PAL founder.

Beth McCann (1917-1986) (Theta), UBC Nursing professor. President of the Theta Alumni chapter in the late 1940s-1950s.

Betty Masumi Inouye (1935-2014) (Theta), Queen's Diamond Jubilee Medal award winner. Her love of contributing to the community began as a member of Phrateres in the 1950s.

Mary Alice Kellogg (Phi Lambda), award-winning journalist

Phoebe Noble (1915-2010) (Founder, Omega chapter), former professor and Dean of Women at the University of Victoria. Organized and chartered the Omega chapter at the University of Victoria in 1961.

Notes

External links 
 Theta Chapter

 
1924 establishments in California
Student organizations established in 1924
Service organizations based in the United States
University of British Columbia